There are currently no operational railways in Cyprus,

 Cyprus Government Railway, 76 miles (122 km), closed in 1951.
 Cyprus Mines Corporation also operated a  gauge railway in the Solea Valley until the Turkish invasion of 1974. Near Xeros, on a former shunting yard, various rolling stock items are rusting away. 
 The Vasilikos–Drapia copper mine railway from Kalavasos to a harbour, closed in 1976.

The Cyprus Railway Museum is located at the former CGR Evrychou railway station, and has a small demonstration track.

Nicosia tram will be created by the Cyprus government, about 2019.

References

Notes

Bibliography

Rail transport in Cyprus